Ojai Valley School is a co-educational independent boarding school in the Ojai Valley near the city of Ojai, California, United States. The school was founded in 1911 and offers pre-kindergarten through twelfth grade education.
 

Ojai Valley School was one of the first boarding schools in the western United States to establish English as a Second Language (ESL) programs for all ability levels.

Campus and facilities 
The school is located on two campuses in the Ojai Valley. The Lower Campus, located near downtown Ojai, enrolls day and resident students in grades pre-kindergarten to eight. The facilities include a performing arts center, dormitories, a library, an art studio, a woodshop, a technology center, athletic fields, a swimming pool, and stables for the equestrian program.

The Upper Campus is located seven miles (11 km) from downtown Ojai, in the east of the valley in Upper Ojai. The  campus enrolls day and resident students in grades nine to twelve. The campus is situated on a former cattle ranch and facilities include dormitories, classrooms, athletic fields, a climbing wall and ropes course, a swimming pool, and art and ceramics studios.

Students participate in outdoor education, equestrian, fine and performing arts programs, as well as athletics and community service.

History 
Edward Yeomans, a Chicagoan educated at Phillips Academy and Princeton University, had written a series of articles in the Atlantic Monthly on the need for educational reform. The articles caught the eye of a wealthy businessman, Frank Frost, who persuaded Yeomans to move to Ojai and create a school that would embody his modern ideas.

At the core of Yeomans’ beliefs was the concept that children learn best through experience. Yeomans considered his own education to have been dull and stifling, and wanted to establish a school that would emphasize experiential learning and a love for the outdoors. He envisioned a place where music, art, and woodshop would be taught alongside math, history, and languages. Yeomans declared that , meaning the wholeness of life, symmetry of life, and soundness of life would become the school’s motto and philosophy. The school has grown from a one-room classroom serving 12 pupils to a two-campus boarding and day school for more than 300 students in pre-kindergarten to twelfth grades.

The school was heavily damaged by the Thomas Fire in December 2017. The fire destroyed two buildings on Upper Ojai campus, a dormitory, and a science and technology building.

References

External links
Ojai Valley School Official Website
The Association of Boarding Schools profile

Preparatory schools in California
Boarding schools in California
Ojai, California
High schools in Ventura County, California
Private high schools in California
Private middle schools in California
Private elementary schools in California
1911 establishments in California